Yarianna Martínez Iglesias (born 20 September 1984 in Pinar del Río) is a female triple jumper from Cuba.

Career
She won the silver medal at the 2002 World Junior Championships, the gold medal at the 2005 Central American and Caribbean Championships and the bronze medal at the 2007 Universiade. She also competed at the 2007 World Championships and the 2008 Olympic Games without reaching the final.

Personal bests
Long jump: 6.07 m (wind: -1.0 m/s) –  La Habana, 28 May 2003
Triple jump: 14.42 m (wind: +1.2 m/s) –  La Habana, 18 February 2011

Achievements

References

External links
Sports reference biography

1984 births
Living people
Cuban female triple jumpers
Athletes (track and field) at the 2008 Summer Olympics
Olympic athletes of Cuba
Universiade medalists in athletics (track and field)
Universiade gold medalists for Cuba
Medalists at the 2007 Summer Universiade
Medalists at the 2009 Summer Universiade
People from Pinar del Río Province
21st-century Cuban women